Vito Postiglione (born 28 February 1977 in Potenza) is an Italian racing driver.

Racing career 
Postiglione won the Italian Renault Mégane Winter Trophy in 1998. He then finished runner-up in the main series in 1999. He went one better, winning the trophy the following year. Naturally, he moved up to the Renault Clio Sport Eurocup and was runner-up in his first season in 2001. The following season was not so good for Postiglione, finishing fifth. He finished third in 2003 and also won his class in the annual Vallelunga 6 Hours in a BMW M3. After finishing fourth in the Clio Eurocup in 2004 he moved to the Italian Ferrari Challenge for 2005. He finished 3rd in 2005, was runner-up in 2006 and won the series in 2007. He also completed in the Ferrari Challenge World Final in these years, finishing 3rd in 2005, 2nd in 2006 and also won it in 2007. He moved to the Italian GT Championship in 2008, driving a Ferrari F430 GT2.

Postiglione made his World Touring Car Championship debut with Proteam Motorsport in 2009, driving a BMW 320si.

Personal 
Postiglione lives with his wife Chiara and his son Luigi. He enjoys playing indoor football.

Racing record

Complete World Touring Car Championship results
(key) (Races in bold indicate pole position) (Races in italics indicate fastest lap)

References

People from Potenza
World Touring Car Championship drivers
Living people
1977 births
Italian racing drivers
Porsche Supercup drivers
Sportspeople from the Province of Potenza
International GT Open drivers
24H Series drivers
Audi Sport drivers
Lamborghini Super Trofeo drivers